Steeple Bumpstead is a village and civil parish  south of Haverhill in Braintree district, Essex, England.

The parish church does not have a steeple, however the Congregational Church has a small Victorian one. It is believed that the steeple referred to was located on the A1017 close to what is now the Wixoe Pumping Station.

Village features include a village hall, School (Steeple Bumpstead Primary school) and park.

History
Bumstead or Bumsted is Anglo-Saxon for "place of reeds". The Moot Hall is recorded in the Domesday Book of 1086. In feudal times it was called Bumstede ad Trim, from "ac-Turrum" or "with the tower". The Knights Templar positioned themselves on the river. The town is notable for its Lollard connections.

There has been a long history on non-conformist belief in the village which continues to this day in the Congregational Church. A Bumpstead man was burnt to death in the parish for his beliefs. Along the Blois Road, leading from Bumpstead to Birdbrook, is a field that has been called the 'Bloody Pightle', and that is where he is believed to have been martyred. In 1527 John Tibauld and eight other village residents were seized and taken before the Bishop of London, charged with meeting together in Bower Hall to pray and read a copy of the New Testament.  Although the non-conformists in the village were encouraged by the powerful Bendyshe family that lived at Bower Hall, even their influence could not save Tibauld. He was burned at the stake.

Having fallen into ruin after use as a 'concentration camp' in the First World War, Bower Hall was finally demolished in 1926 and the materials sold off. The great staircase found its way to the United States.

A Moot Hall, known as 'the Old Schole', symbolises Steeple Bumpstead. Built in 1592 by the inhabitants on land rented from the Crown, in the 1830s when it was 'a school for farmers' sons' the villagers forcibly took possession of it, disputing the claim of George Gent of Moyns to have the right to appoint the headmaster. Eventually an ecclesiastical court upheld the villagers' claim.

Steeple Bumpstead was one of the first villages in the country to have its own village policeman when county policing came into being in Essex. In 1840, William Rattigan was one of the first Essex Police Officers to be assigned a village beat. There was a police officer stationed in the village for 160 years from 1840 to 2000 when the last 'bobby', Ray Howard, retired. For years the village was a hotbed of trouble with many 'riots' and unrest during the agricultural strikes in 1914 and the 1920s. In fact the national agricultural strike of 1914 was started nearby in Castle Camps and the troubles spread to Steeple Bumpstead, which became a stronghold for the strikers.

Modern times

There are many facilities in Steeple Bumpstead for residents including a local village store, a post office, a petrol station, and a library in the aforementioned Moot Hall. Steeple Bumpstead has its own medical practice. There are two pubs, The Fox and Hounds and The Red Lion.

There are two churches, the Church of England parish church of St. Mary's and the Congregational Church, each offering various activities for all ages. St Mary's is a grade I listed building dating from the 11th century.

Steeple Bumpstead has a primary school, Steeple Bumpstead Primary School.

Steeple Bumpstead has a Scout Group: 1st Steeple Bumpstead Scouts which consists of a Beaver Colony, A Cub Pack and a Scout Troop.  The group in total has circa 100 members. There is also an active Brownies group, and a Girl Guides group.

Recently there has been much property development around Steeple Bumpstead including the addition of Freezes Barns, Old Hall Close and Suckling's Yard.

Steeple Bumpstead was also mentioned in the first pages of the 2007 novel The Reavers by George MacDonald Fraser.

The village is referred to in Episode 5 of the first series of The Fall and Rise of Reginald Perrin broadcast on BBC1 (1976). Perrin tries to insult a colleague by saying that they are Lecturer in 'Applied Manure from The University of Steeple Bumpstead'.

Notable residents
Nurse Edith Cavell had ties with Steeple Bumpstead long before she became a nurse. During 1886, Edith was appointed governess to the four children of the Reverend Charles Powell, vicar of Steeple Bumpstead. The former vicarage, where a stone plaque commemorates her stay, is a private residence on the corner of Chapel Street and Finchingfield Road. There is a plaque about Edith Cavell in the 11th century village church and a road named after her.

Colonel J. C. Humphrey, son of the village wheelwright, may have allegedly invented corrugated iron, but this is myth as it was invented by Henry Robinson Palmer in 1829. He built and lived in the Iron House, North Street, which was demolished in the 1960s. At one time Humphreys Ltd of London claimed to be the 'largest works in the world' and held a Royal Warrant as 'supplier to His Majesty King Edward VII’.

Lord and Lady Taylor moved to the village in 2013 and are said to still be in residence.

See also
 The Hundred Parishes

References

External links

 
Villages in Essex
Civil parishes in Essex
Braintree District